In 2008, 4.7 million people in Asia were living with human immunodeficiency virus (HIV). Asia's epidemic peaked in the mid-1990s, and annual HIV incidence has declined since then by more than half. Regionally, the epidemic has remained somewhat stable since 2000.

South Asia
Compared with other regions, notably Africa and the Americas, national HIV prevalence levels in South Asia are very low (0.3% in the adult (15–49) group). However, due to the large populations of many South Asian nations, this low national HIV prevalence still means that many people have HIV.

In South Asia, the HIV epidemic remains largely concentrated in injecting drug users, men who have sex with men, sex workers, clients of sex workers and their immediate sexual partners. Prevention strategies in these populations are, for the most part, inadequate.

Afghanistan

The prevalence of HIV in Afghanistan is 0.04%. According to Afghanistan's National Aids Control Program (NACP), 504 cases of HIV/AIDS were documented in late 2008. By the end of 2012, the number reached 1,327. As of 2015, as many as 6,900 people were living in Afghanistan with HIV and about 300 had died in from the disease.

Bangladesh

With less than 0.1% of the population estimated to be HIV-positive, Bangladesh is a low HIV-prevalence country. UNAIDS estimates that 11,000 people live with HIV in the country.

Bhutan

In 2011, there were 246 reported cases of HIV in Bhutan, representing just over 0.03% of the population. However, Health Ministry sources indicated actual numbers were estimated at more than 500 by UNAIDS.

India

In 2015, the NACO estimated that 2.11 million people live with HIV/AIDS in India. As of 2018, India has the third most people with HIV after South Africa and Nigeria. However, the AIDS prevalence rate in India is lower than many other countries. In 2016, India's AIDS prevalence rate stood at approximately 0.30%, the 80th highest in the world.

Nepal

UNAIDS estimates from 2017 indicate that approximately 375,000 people in Nepal are HIV-positive across all age groups. The Government of Nepal's National Center for AIDS & STD Control (NCASC) estimated that number to be closer to 70,000 in December 2010. A study from 2014 found that the overall national HIV prevalence was 0.20% (adult male 19.28%, adult female 25.13%). According to UNAIDS, by the end of 2018, the number of people living with HIV was 139,000 [34,000–46,000]. NCASC (2019) reports that the estimated number of HIV infections by risk groups is 159,984.

Pakistan

The Pakistan National AIDS Control Program estimated that in 2018, there were a total of 160,000 people living with HIV. However, there are only 39,529 cases of HIV that have been registered with the National AIDS Control Program, of which 22,947 are receiving antiretroviral therapy. The HIV prevalence rate is far higher among people who inject drugs (21.0%) compared to the general population of people aged 15 to 49 (0.1%).

Sri Lanka

East Asia
National HIV prevalence levels in East Asia are much lower (0.1% in the adult (15-49) group) than in much of Africa and the Americas. Similar to South Asian countries, low national HIV prevalence still means that large numbers of people are living with HIV.

China

Much of the current spread of HIV in the People's Republic of China is through intravenous drug abuse and paid sex.  In rural areas, especially in Henan province, large numbers of farmers had contaminated blood transfusions; estimates of those infected are in the tens of thousands.

Japan

Official figures (English) for July–October 2006 showed that just over half of domestic HIV/AIDS cases were among homosexual men, with the remainder transmitted through heterosexual intercourse, drug abuse, in the womb or via unknown means. As of 2015, there had been 17,909 HIV and 8,086 AIDS cases reported in Japan since 1985.

North Korea

According to UNAIDS, less than 0.2% of North Korea's adult population has HIV. WHO estimates that North Korea has less than 100 people with HIV/AIDS. Officially, the country maintains that it is completely free of AIDS.

South Korea
The cumulative reported cases of HIV in South Korea has surpassed 6,000, with 797 reported in 2008.

According to the Korea Centers for Disease Control and Prevention, the prevalence of HIV in South Korea is rising. The first case of HIV was in 1985. By 2000, the number of people diagnosed with HIV was 219, and this had risen to 797 in 2008. Males had a much higher infection rate. In order to prevent Korean women from contracting HIV, HIV positive males should be detected early on. The most commonly recognized mode of transmission in South Korea is through heterosexual sexual contact.

Due to the lower prevalence of HIV in South Korea, the Korean media has represented HIV as a disease brought to Korea by migrant sex workers from other countries. Any sex workers who plan to stay in South Korea must test for HIV, and if results show they are positive, they are no longer able to stay in the country.

Taiwan

As of March 2016, there were 31,620 reported cases of Taiwanese nationals testing positive for HIV/AIDS. Currently, HIV/AIDS patients who are Taiwanese nationals receive free medical care (including HAART therapies) from the state. Non-governmental organizations have set up "AIDS Half-Way Houses" for homeless patients. The ratio of patients who are drug users has increased rapidly, which has led the authority to promote a harm reduction program.

South-East Asia
National HIV prevalence levels in South-East Asia are very low, at 0.3% in the adult (15-49) group. In Southeast Asia, the HIV epidemic remains largely concentrated in injecting drug users, men who have sex with men, sex workers, and clients of sex workers and their immediate sexual partners. Prevention strategies in these populations are generally inadequate.

Cambodia

Between 2003 and 2005, the estimated HIV prevalence among Cambodian adults aged 15 to 49 declined from 2.0% to 1.6%.

East Timor (Timor-Leste)

Timor-Leste is a low HIV-prevalence country with less than 0.2% of the adult population estimated to be HIV-positive. Forty-three cases of the disease were confirmed in 2007 and are now under treatment, according to the Ministry of Health.

Indonesia

UNAIDS has said that HIV/AIDS in Indonesia is one of Asia's fastest growing epidemics. It was expected that 5 million Indonesians would have HIV/AIDS by 2010. In 2007, Indonesia was ranked 99th in the world by prevalence rate, but because of low understanding of the symptoms of the disease and high social stigma attached to it, only 5–10% of HIV/AIDS sufferers were diagnosed and treated.

Laos

In 2005, UNAIDS estimated that 3,700 people in Lao PDR were living with HIV. Lao PDR currently faces a concentrated epidemic with an adult HIV prevalence of 0.1%.

Malaysia

On World AIDS Day in June 2008, Malaysia reported 82,704 cumulative HIV cases since 1986.

Myanmar

In 2005, the estimated adult HIV prevalence rate in Myanmar was 1.3% (200,000–570,000 people) according to UNAIDS, and early indicators show that the epidemic may be waning in the country, although the epidemic continues to expand in parts of the country. An estimated 20,000 (range between 11,000 and 35,000) die from HIV/AIDS annually.

Philippines

The Philippines has a relatively low incidence of HIV/AIDS. There have been about 2,800 reported cases since 1984, but independent estimates put the number of cases closer to 12,000. The majority (70–75%) of carriers are male, 25–39, and the predominant mode of transmission is through sexual intercourse.

Although the national incidence rate remains relatively low, an independent HIV surveillance study conducted in 2010 by Dr. Louie Mar Gangcuangco and colleagues from the University of the Philippines-Philippine General Hospital showed that out of 406 men having sex with men tested for HIV in Metro Manila, HIV prevalence was at 11.8% (95% confidence interval: 8.7–15.0).

Singapore
The Ministry of Health maintains a confidential registry of HIV positive individuals. The private details of 8,800 foreigners and 5,400 Singaporeans infected with HIV were exposed as a result of improper handling of the data. The details of some 5,400 Singaporeans and permanent residents diagnosed with HIV up to January 2013, and 8,800 foreigners diagnosed up to December 2011 were leaked, by Mikhy Farrera-Brochez, a US citizen. It was in retaliation for Farrera-Brochez being deported from Singapore for falsify documents that granted him work privileges in Singapore and for covering up the fact he has HIV on an application form. He was supplied the details by his, then boyfriend, Ler Teck Siang, a doctor in Singapore. Ler also provided his own blood sample to cover up Farrera-Brochez's HIV status.

Thailand

Around 532,522 Thais were living with HIV/AIDS in 2008.

Vietnam

The UN estimated that there were 290,000 people living with HIV as of 2008.

West Asia

Armenia

Azerbaijan

The Adult prevalence rate was less than 0.2% in 2012, with an estimated 10,400 people living with HIV/AIDS and 65 deaths.

Bahrain

The Adult prevalence rate was estimated at 0.01% in 2016, with fewer than 500 people with HIV/AIDS and fewer than 100 deaths.

Iran

Iraq

Jordan

In 2007, there were an estimated 380,000 people living with HIV/AIDS (PLWHA) in the region, according to UNAIDS.

Saudi Arabia

In 2003, the government announced the number of known cases of HIV/AIDS in the country to be 6,700, and over 10,000 in June 2008.

Turkey

According to the United Nations HIV/AIDS Theme Group's 2002 HIV/AIDS Situation Analysis report in Turkey, 7,000–14,000 people had been infected with AIDS since the beginning of the pandemic. The Ministry of Health in June 2002 stated that 1,429 HIV/AIDS cases had been reported since 1985.

United Arab Emirates

Official figures show that 540 people were living with HIV/AIDS by the end of 2006, and the number of recorded new cases was about 35 annually.

See also
AIDS pandemic
HIV/AIDS in Africa
HIV/AIDS in Europe
HIV/AIDS in North America
HIV/AIDS in South America

References

External links
AIDS epidemic update 2005 (PDF)
Specific country data from UNAIDS
AIDSPortal Asia page Latest research, case studies and news stories
AIDSPortal Central Asia page Latest research, case studies and news stories

 
Asian society
Health in Asia